USS Shamal (PC-13) is the thirteenth . Shamal was laid down 23 September 1994 by Bollinger Shipyards, Lockport, Louisiana and launched 3 March 1995. She was commissioned 27 January 1996. Decommissioned by the United States Navy 1 October 2004 and transferred to the United States Coast Guard and recommissioned the USCGC Shamal (WPC-13).

Shamal was transferred back to the Navy on 30 September 2011, and is once again designated PC-13.

Shamal was decommissioned on 16 February 2021 at Naval Station Mayport.

References

External links
Federation of American Scientists, Cyclone class ship characteristics

 

Cyclone-class patrol ships
Ships of the United States Coast Guard
Ships built in Lockport, Louisiana
1995 ships